Vejle railway station, also known as Vejle Transit Centre, is a railway station serving the town of Vejle in East Jutland, Denmark.

The station is located on the Fredericia-Aarhus railway line from Fredericia to Aarhus and is the southeastern terminus of the Vejle-Holstebro railway line from Vejle to Holstebro. It offers direct InterCity services to Copenhagen, Hamburg, Struer, Aarhus and Aalborg as well as regional train services to Aarhus, Fredericia, Herning, and Struer. The train services are operated by DSB and Arriva.

References

Citations

Bibliography

External links

 Banedanmark – government agency responsible for maintenance and traffic control of most of the Danish railway network
 DSB – largest Danish train operating company
 Arriva – British multinational public transport company operating bus and train services in Denmark
 Danske Jernbaner – website with information on railway history in Denmark

Railway stations opened in 1868
Railway stations in the Region of Southern Denmark
1868 establishments in Denmark
Railway stations in Denmark opened in the 19th century